Davidson v. New Orleans, 96 U.S. 97 (1878), was a United States Supreme Court case in which the Court upheld a Louisiana statute that provided for special assessments against property for drainage purposes.

References

External links
 

United States Supreme Court cases
United States Supreme Court cases of the Waite Court
1878 in United States case law
Legal history of Louisiana